Corrado Valle (21 October 1909 – 1976) was an Italian hurdler who was 5th in the 110 m hs at the 1934 European Athletics Championships.

Biography
Corrado Valle after the finish of his sporting career, about in the end of the 1930s, graduated in economics and commerce. He married twice, and had two daughters, Gabriella from the first and Dada from the second wife. He tragically died in 1976 at the age of 66 in a car accident in Capalbio.

Achievements

See also
 Italy at the 1934 European Athletics Championships

References

1909 births
1976 deaths
Italian male hurdlers
Sportspeople from the Province of Grosseto
People from Scansano